Albania was recognised as a potential candidate country for EU accession in 2003 and officially submitted a membership application in April 2009. Several agreements ensure close collaboration between the EU and Albania. A European partnership with Albania provides support to the Albanian authorities in their quest for EU membership by identifying areas in which further effort and reforms are required.

A Stabilisation and Association Agreement (SAA) entered into force on 1 April 2009, laying out the conditions for membership. Short stays in the EU became easier in 2008 with the entry into force of a visa facilitation agreement.

Albania is a potential candidate country for EU accession following the Thessaloniki European Council of June 2003. On 18 February 2008 the Council adopted a new European partnership with Albania. The Stabilisation and Association Agreement (SAA) with the country was signed on 12 June 2006 and entered into force on 1 April 2009. It supersedes the Interim Agreement on trade and trade-related aspects, which entered into force in December 2006. The EU-Albania visa facilitation agreement entered into force in January 2008 while the readmission agreement entered into force in 2006.

Timeline
Key dates in Albania's path towards the EU include:

References

Attribution
This article incorporates text from:
"EU-Albania relations", European Union
"EU-Albania relations", European Commission

Albania–European Union relations
Politics of the European Union
Diplomatic missions of the European Union